The Brugsch Papyrus (Pap. Berl. 3038), also known as the Greater Berlin Papyrus or simply Berlin Papyrus, is an important ancient Egyptian medical papyrus. It was discovered by Giuseppe Passalacqua in Saqqara, Egypt. Friedrich Wilhelm IV of Prussia acquired it in 1827 for the Berlin Museum, where it is still housed. The style of writing is that of the 19th Dynasty, and it is dated between 1350 and 1200 BC.

The papyrus was studied initially by Heinrich Karl Brugsch, but was translated and published by Walter Wreszinski in 1909. Only a German translation is available.

The papyrus contains twenty-four pages of writing. Much of it is parallel to the Ebers Papyrus. Some of the contents deals with contraception and fertility tests.
Some historians believe that this papyrus was used by Galen in his writings.

References

Bibliography

External links

Ancient Egyptian medical works
Egyptian papyri